Alexander Jackson Maconnachie (13 May 1876 – 1956) was a Scottish footballer who played in the Football League for Derby County and Notts County.

References

1876 births
1956 deaths
Scottish footballers
English Football League players
Association football forwards
Derby County F.C. players
Notts County F.C. players
Ashfield F.C. players
Third Lanark A.C. players
Ilkeston United F.C. players
Alfreton Town F.C. players
Scottish Football League players